Septentrionia is an extinct genus of jawless fish belonging to the family Septentrioniidae. It is the type genus of its family.

References

External links
 

Birkeniiformes genera
Fossil taxa described in 2002